Maria Lourdes "Marides" Carlos-Fernando (born February 10, 1957) is a Filipino politician who served as the Mayor of Marikina from 2001 until 2010. She is married to former MMDA Chairman Bayani Fernando, also a former city mayor of Marikina. She was among the 11 finalists for the 2008 World Mayor award, ranking 7th.

See also
World Mayor

References

External links
World Mayor website
Voting for World Mayor 2008
City Mayors profile

1957 births
Lakas–CMD (1991) politicians
Living people
Mayors of Marikina
Women mayors of places in the Philippines